The 129th Massachusetts General Court, consisting of the Massachusetts Senate and the Massachusetts House of Representatives, met in 1908 during the governorship of Curtis Guild Jr. William D. Chapple served as president of the Senate and John N. Cole served as speaker of the House.

Senators

Representatives

See also
 1908 Massachusetts gubernatorial election
 60th United States Congress
 List of Massachusetts General Courts

Images

References

Further reading

External links

 
 

Political history of Massachusetts
Massachusetts legislative sessions
massachusetts
1908 in Massachusetts